Jesse Oren Kellerman (born September 1, 1978) is an American novelist and playwright. He is the author of the novels Sunstroke (2006), Trouble (2007), The Genius (2008), The Executor (2010), Potboiler (2012), and has co-authored numerous books with his father Jonathan Kellerman, including The Golem of Hollywood (2014).

Life and career
Kellerman was born in Los Angeles, California, the oldest child and only son of the bestselling mystery novelists Faye Kellerman and Jonathan Kellerman. His first published title coauthored with  his father was their 1994 book of children's poetry, Daddy, Daddy, Can You Touch the Sky?

Kellerman studied psychology at Harvard and playwriting at Brandeis University. For a time he served as lead guitarist for the L.A.-based indie rock band Don't Shoot the Dog.

His 2004 play Things Beyond Our Control was honored with a Princess Grace Award, which recognizes emerging talent in theater, dance, and film in the US. Kellerman is also  recipient of the Grand Prix des Lectrices de Elle.

His essay "Let My People Go to the Buffet" was chosen for Penguin's annual anthology The Best American Spiritual Writing in 2011. His 2012 book Potboiler was nominated for that year's Edgar Award for Best Novel.

Kellerman is an Orthodox Jew, as are his parents, and resides in Berkeley, California, with his wife, Gabriella Sarah (Rosen), and their three children.

Bibliography

Stand-alone novels
 Sunstroke (2006) 
 Trouble (2007) 
 The Genius (2008) (published in the UK as The Brutal Art) 
 The Executor (2010) 
 Potboiler (2012) (published in the UK as I'll Catch You)

The Golem series
 The Golem of Hollywood (2014) (with Jonathan Kellerman)
 The Golem of Paris (8 November 2015) (with Jonathan Kellerman)

Clay Edison series
 Crime Scene (2017)  (with Jonathan Kellerman) 
 A Measure of Darkness (July 31, 2018) (with Jonathan Kellerman) 
 Half Moon Bay (aka Lost Souls) (July 2020) (with Jonathan Kellerman) 
 The Burning (September 2021) (with Jonathan Kellerman)

Play

https://www.penguinrandomhouse.com/books/576802/the-burning-by-jonathan-kellerman-and-jesse-kellerman/

Play
 Things Beyond Our Control (2004)

References

External links
Official website

1978 births
Living people
American Orthodox Jews
Brandeis University alumni
Harvard University alumni
Jewish American dramatists and playwrights
Jewish American novelists
People from Beverly Hills, California
Princess Grace Awards winners
Writers from Los Angeles
American male novelists
American male dramatists and playwrights
21st-century American novelists
21st-century American dramatists and playwrights
21st-century American male writers